Leonid Ivanov (born 25 August 1937) is a former long-distance runner who competed in the 10,000 metres at the 1964 Summer Olympics for the Soviet Union. He was born in Zaporizhia in the Ukrainian SSR.

References

1937 births
Living people
Sportspeople from Zaporizhzhia
Soviet male long-distance runners
Kyrgyzstani male long-distance runners
Olympic athletes of the Soviet Union
Athletes (track and field) at the 1964 Summer Olympics
Universiade medalists in athletics (track and field)
Universiade gold medalists for the Soviet Union
Kyrgyzstani people of Ukrainian descent
Medalists at the 1963 Summer Universiade